The 1928 Navy Midshipmen football team represented the United States Naval Academy during the 1928 college football season. In their third season under head coach Bill Ingram, the Midshipmen compiled a 5–3–1 record, shut out five opponents, and outscored all opponents by a combined score of 121 to 21.

The annual Army–Navy Game was canceled due to disagreement over player eligibility standards.

Schedule

References

Navy
Navy Midshipmen football seasons
Navy Midshipmen football